5-Fluoro-α-methyltryptamine (5-Fluoro-αMT, 5F-AMT), also known as PAL-544, is a putative stimulant, entactogen, and psychedelic tryptamine derivative related to α-methyltryptamine (αMT). It has been found to act as a well-balanced serotonin-norepinephrine-dopamine releasing agent, a 5-HT2A receptor agonist, and a potent and specific MAO-A inhibitor. which suggests that 5-fluoro-αMT could be an active psychedelic in humans, although it is not known to have been tested in humans and could be dangerous due to its strong inhibition of MAO-A.

See also 
 5-Chloro-αMT
 5-Fluoro-AET
 5-Fluoro-DMT
 6-Fluoro-AMT
 7-Chloro-AMT
 7-Methyl-αET
 Flucindole
 5-API (PAL-571)

References

Further reading 

 

Entactogens and empathogens
Monoamine oxidase inhibitors
Fluoroarenes
Psychedelic tryptamines
Serotonin-norepinephrine-dopamine releasing agents
Stimulants